Anyuysk is a rural locality (a selo) in Bilibinsky District in Chukotka Autonomous Okrug, Russia, located west of Bilibino on the border with the Sakha Republic and on the banks of the Maly Anyuy River. The village is 272 km to Bilibino and approximately 800 km to Anadyr. Population:  Municipally, Anyuysk is subordinated to Bilibinsky Municipal District and is incorporated as Anyuysk Rural Settlement.

History
The village was founded in 1930 as a result of the collectivisation of a number of nomadic herders who settled in the village establishing two collective farms: "First of May" and "New Life". Once the farms were established the village grew rapidly and a boarding school and kindergarten were constructed. These farms were reorganised into a single entity in 1960 under the name "Anyuysky". Anyuysk was the administrative centre of Bilibino District (then called Eastern Tundra District) from March 15, 1950, when it took over responsibilities from Ostrovnoye until August 2, 1961, when responsibilities passed to the current administrative centre, Bilibino. In the 1980s a dairy farm was established in order to provide milk to the school and the villagers.

Economy
The main occupation of the inhabitants is reindeer herding and fishing, hunting and trapping. Currently, Anyuysk is the base for the municipal agricultural enterprise "Lakeside". The village has a school, local hospital, post office, communications center, a cultural center, a library, a hotel with ten beds.

Culture
The village holds an annual bear festival. There is a children's group called Souvenir, a sports, dance and singing club called Masteritsa and a folk dance ensemble called Nyoltyn.

Demographics
The population as of the beginning of January 2012 was 472, mainly Evens, a slight reduction on the 2010 official census figure of 480, split equally between men and women. As of January 2012, the ethnic make up of the village was as following:

This is down on the population as of 2006, which was around 600 people, of which 340 were natives, which itself was up from 535 people reported in 2005 in an environmental impact report for the Kupol Gold Project. The head of the village administration is Andrey Kulinenko.

Transport
Anyuysk is not connected by permanent road to any other populated settlement however, there is a tractor road linking the village to Chersky, an urban locality (a settlement) and the administrative center of Nizhnekolymsky District of the Sakha Republic via the settlement of Panteleyikha, also in the Sakha Republic. The Maly Anyuy River also links Anyuysk to the Kolyma River and other settlements such as Nizhnekolymsk. There is however, a network of roads within the village including:

 Улица Василия Драного (Ulitsa Vasiliya Dranogo, lit. Vasiliy Drany Street)
 Улица Гагарина (Ulitsa Gagarina, lit. Gagarin Street)
 Улица Клубная (Ulitsa Klubnaya, lit. Club Street)
 Улица Лесаковского (Ulitsa Lesakovskogo, lit. Lesakovsky Street)
 Улица Лесная (Ulitsa Lesnaya, lit. Forest Street)
 Улица Мира (Ulitsa Mira, lit. Peace Street)
 Улица Набережная (Ulitsa Naberezhnaya, lit. Quay Street)
 Улица Новая (Ulitsa Novaya, lit. New Street)
 Улица Полярная (Ulitsa Polyarnaya, lit. Polar Street)
 Улица Почтовая (Ulitsa Pochtovaya, lit. Postal Street)
 Улица Ручейная (Ulitsa Rucheinaya, lit. Brook Street)
 Улица Советская (Ulitsa Sovetskaya, lit. Soviet Street)
 Улица Черского (Ulitsa Cherskogo, lit. Chersky Street)
 Улица Юбилейная (Ulitsa Jubileinaya, lit. Jubilee Street)

Climate
Anyuysk has a Continental Subarctic or Boreal (taiga) climate' (Dfc).

See also
List of inhabited localities in Bilibinsky District

References

Notes

Sources
Bema Gold Corporation, Environmental Impact Assessment, Kupol Gold Project, Far East Russia June 2005
Dallmann, W.K. Indigenous Peoples of the north of the Russian Federation, Map 3.6, Chukotskiy Avtonomyy Okrug. 1997.
 
 

 Strogoff, M, Brochet, P-C and Auzias, D. Petit Futé: Chukotka, "Avant-Garde" Publishing House, 2006.

External links
 Photo gallery of Anyuysk

Rural localities in Chukotka Autonomous Okrug
Populated places of Arctic Russia